Stephen N. Six (born December 11, 1965) is an American attorney and former judge from Kansas who served as the state's 43rd Attorney General. He was nominated to serve as a judge on the United States Court of Appeals for the Tenth Circuit on March 9, 2011. His nomination was returned to the President on December 17, 2011, pursuant to the rules of the Senate. He served as a partner at the Kansas City, New York, and San Diego based law firm, Stueve Siegel Hanson LLP.

Early life and education
Stephen Six is the son of former Kansas Supreme Court Justice Fred Six. He received a Bachelor of Arts degree from Carleton College in Northfield, Minnesota, in 1988 and earned his J.D. degree from the University of Kansas in 1993.

Career
Following graduation from law school, Six served as a law clerk to Judge Deanell Reece Tacha of the United States Court of Appeals for the Tenth Circuit. From 1994 to 2005, he served as a partner in the Kansas City, Missouri, law firm of Shamberg, Johnson, and Bergman. He was appointed as a judge on the Douglas County Circuit Court by Governor Sebelius in January 2005, serving in that post until his appointment as attorney general by Governor Kathleen Sebelius in 2008.

Six was defeated in the 2010 general election by Republican State Senate Majority Leader Derek Schmidt.

Following completion of his service as attorney general, he became a partner in the Kansas City, Missouri, firm Stueve Siegel Hanson LLP.

43rd Attorney General of Kansas
Six was recognized by Kansas editorial boards for restoring professionalism and stability to the office after the tenures of previous Attorneys General, Republican Phill Kline whose bar privileges were suspended, and Democrat Paul J. Morrison whose personal problems forced him from office.  Six was also recognized for cutting the office's taxpayer-funded budget almost in half.

Six focused the office on protecting consumers and cracking down on fraud and waste in the state Medicaid program. During Six's tenure, the Consumer Protection Division recovered $39.5 million on behalf of Kansans. The Medicaid Fraud Division recovered $66.2 million.

In 2008, Six became the first Kansas Attorney General in 35 years to personally prosecute a case.  He earned a jury conviction in 2008 of Kenneth Wilson for the first-degree murder of Scott Noel in Osborne County, Kansas.  He earned a jury conviction in 2009 of Israel Mireles for the capital murder of Emily Sander in Butler County, Kansas.

On December 1, 2008, Attorney General Six argued before the United States Supreme Court in Kansas v. Colorado, a dispute over Colorado's overuse of water in the Arkansas River.

Failed nomination to the Tenth Circuit 
On March 9, 2011, President Barack Obama nominated Six to the United States Court of Appeals for the Tenth Circuit, to fill the vacancy created by the decision by Judge Deanell Reece Tacha to take senior status.  His nomination was strongly opposed by his home state Senators, Pat Roberts and Jerry Moran. Because of that opposition, the Judiciary Committee chose not to take up his nomination. His nomination and others were returned to the president on December 17, 2011, pursuant to the rules of the Senate, and the president chose not to renominate him.

Personal
Six is married to Betsy Brand Six, a law professor at the University of Kansas, and is a member of the United Church of Christ.

See also
 Barack Obama judicial appointment controversies

References

1965 births
Living people
20th-century American lawyers
21st-century American lawyers
Carleton College alumni
Kansas Attorneys General
Kansas Democrats
Kansas state court judges
Politicians from Lawrence, Kansas
University of Kansas School of Law alumni